The Asian red-eyed bulbul (Pycnonotus brunneus) is a member of the bulbul family of passerine birds. 
It is found on the Malay Peninsula, Sumatra, and Borneo.
Its natural habitat is subtropical or tropical moist lowland forests.

Taxonomy and systematics
Alternate names for the Asian red-eyed bulbul include the brown bulbul (also used for the common bulbul), red-eyed brown bulbul, and red-eyed bulbul (also used for the African red-eyed bulbul).

Subspecies
Two subspecies are recognized:
 P. b. brunneus - Blyth, 1845: Found from the Malay Peninsula to Sumatra and Borneo and nearby islands
 P. b. zapolius - Oberholser, 1917: Found on the Anambas Islands

References

External links
 Red-eyed bulbul - Species text in The Atlas of Southern African Birds.

Asian red-eyed bulbul
Birds of Malesia
Asian red-eyed bulbul
Asian red-eyed bulbul
Taxonomy articles created by Polbot